The Wound is a 1998 international co-production drama film, written, produced and directed by Yılmaz Arslan, starring Yelda Reynaud as a young Turkish emigrant who is forcibly repatriated by her own family.

Production
The film was shot on location in Heidelberg and Frankfurt am Main, Germany and, Aksaray and Istanbul, Turkey.

Reception
Variety reviewer David Stratton said "Yara succeeds on one level: as a portrait of an independent femme’s struggle to escape her environment and survive against all the odds stacked against her. But pic suffers from melodramatic elements and a lack of motivation, making for dim international commercial prospects".

Musical score and soundtrack

The film score was composed, by Rabih Abou-Khalil and the soundtrack album was released on the Enja label in 1998.

Reception

Allmusic's Michael G. Nastos noted, "the music of Khalil does stand beautifully on its own ... Selections flow freely into each other, much unison playing between the string instruments is prevalent, and Khalil takes the bulk of the lead ... There's pure wonder and revelation in this music. You'll have to see the film to get the full gist, but without the moving pictures, Khalil's unique music is indeed a moving experience in and of its own accord. Recommended". In JazzTimes, Josef Woodard said "Yara emerges here as a set of tunes standing up on its own musical merits-with cinematic evocations, but also a coherent life of its own. The pieces tend to be based on linear, horizontal constructions, entrancingly winding melodies ... this chamber setting conveys a sense of melancholic elegance, alternately bustling with subtle energy and purring with a sad, languid beauty".

Track listing
All compositions by Rabih Abou-Khalil
 "Requiem" – 6:48
 "Imminent Journey" – 1:17
 "A Gracious Man" – 4:55
 "On a Bus" – 4:16
 "Grateful Parting" – 7:09
 "The Passage of Life" – 4:05
 "Through the Window" – 5:43
 "Lithe Dream" – 5:38
 "Puppet Master" – 3:42
 "Bint el Bahr" – 6:47
 "The End of Faith" – 2:16
 "The Knowledge of a Child" – 2:19

Personnel
Rabih Abou-Khalil – oud
Dominique Pifarély – violin
Vincent Courtois – cello
Nabil Khaiat – frame drums

References

External links 

1998 drama films
Austrian drama films
German drama films
Swiss drama films
Turkish drama films
Films set in Turkey
Films shot in Turkey
Golden Orange Award for Best Film winners
Films scored by Rabih Abou-Khalil
1990s Turkish-language films
1990s German films